Pangmi was a Shan state in the Myelat region of what is today Burma. It was very small, having an area of only , and was almost entirely enclosed by Hsamonghkam. Its population was mostly Danu and Pa-O.

References

Shan States